The Frauen DFB-Pokal 1996–97 was the 17th season of the cup competition, Germany's second-most important title in women's football. In the final which was held in Berlin on 14 June 1997 Grün-Weiß Brauweiler defeated Eintracht Rheine 3–1, thus winning their third cup title.

First round

Several clubs had byes in the first round. Those clubs were automatically qualified for the 2nd round of the cup. Also as a team promoted to the Bundesliga VfL Wittekind Wildeshausen would have been eligible to participate in the cup, but did not for reasons unknown.

Second round

* Hertha Zehlendorf was disqualified for fielding Ariane Hingst who was not eligible to play.

Third round

Quarter-finals

Semi-finals

Final

See also 
 Bundesliga 1996–97
 1996–97 DFB-Pokal men's competition

DFB-Pokal Frauen seasons
Pokal
Fra